The Cathedral of the Transfiguration of Our Lord  also called Catholic Cathedral of Atyrau is a religious building affiliated with the Catholic Church which is in the Avangard street of the city of Atyrau, 2 in Eurasian country of Kazakhstan, and which serves as the seat of the apostolic administration of Atyrau.

The local apostolic administration (Administratio Apostolica Atirauensis or Апостольская администратура Атырау) was founded in 1999 under the pontificate of John Paul II by the bull "Ad aptius consulendum" while the parish was created. The parish church and the cathedral was consecrated on August 4, 2002. The convent and pastoral center was opened in 2005.

See also
Cathedral of the Transfiguration of Our Lord, Kaišiadorys
Catholic Church in Kazakhstan
Transfiguration of Our Lord

References

Roman Catholic cathedrals in Kazakhstan
Buildings and structures in Atyrau
Roman Catholic churches completed in 2002